The Defence of the Seven Sacraments is a theological treatise published in 1521, written by King Henry VIII of England, allegedly with the assistance of Sir Thomas More. The extent of More's involvement with this project has been a point of contention since its publication.

Henry started to write it in 1519 while he was reading Martin Luther's attack on indulgences. By June of that year, he had shown it to Thomas Wolsey, but it remained private until three years later when the earlier manuscript became the first two chapters of the Assertio, the rest consisting of new material relating to Luther's De Captivitate Babylonica.

Author J. J. Scarisbrick describes the work as "one of the most successful pieces of Catholic polemics produced by the first generation of anti-Protestant writers". It went through some twenty editions in the sixteenth century and, as early as 1522, had appeared in two different German translations.

The treatise was dedicated to Pope Leo X, who rewarded Henry with the title Fidei Defensor (Defender of the Faith) in October 1521 (a title revoked following the king's break with the Catholic Church in the 1530s,<ref>Assertio septem sacramentorum adversus Martinum Lutherum, Henry VIII, King of England; Pierre Fraenkel, Münster, Aschendorff, 1992, Corpus Catholicorum, vol. 43.  </ref> but re-awarded to his heir by the English Parliament).

Luther's reply to the Assertio (Against Henry, King of the English) was, in turn, replied to by Thomas More, who was one of the leaders of the Catholic Renaissance humanists in England (Responsio ad Lutherum).

The British Library still has King Henry's personal copy of Marko Marulić's Evangelistiarium, a book that was read in English and much admired by Thomas More. Extensive margin notes in the king's own hand prove that Marulić's book was a major source used by the king in the writing of Defence of the Seven Sacraments.

Editions and translations
 O'Donovan, L. O. & Gibbons, J. (1908). 'Assertio Septem Sacramentorum' (English and Latin). New York, NY: Benziger Bros. Publishing
 O'Donovan, L. O. & Curtin, D. P. (2018). 'Defense of the Seven Sacraments' (with additional Papal correspondence). Philadelphia, PA: Barnes & Noble Press

See also
 Sacraments of the Catholic Church
 English Reformation
 Henry VIII
 Thomas More

References

Further reading
Vian, Nello (1962) La Presentazione e gli esemplari vaticani della “Assertio septem sacramentorum” di Enrico VIII. (E librorum qui dicuntur Collectanea Vaticana in honorem Anselmi M. Card. Albareda a Bibliotheca Apostolica edita altero.)'' In Civitate Vaticana

1521 books
Books about Christianity
English non-fiction literature
Catholic liturgy
16th-century Christian texts
16th-century Latin books
Books by Henry VIII